The Manado metropolitan area, known locally as Bimindo (an acronym of Bitung–Minahasa–Manado), is a metropolitan area anchored by the city of Manado in North Sulawesi, Indonesia. It includes the cities of Bitung and Tomohon, as well as Minahasa Regency and North Minahasa Regency. It is the second-largest metropolitan area in Sulawesi with an estimated population of nearly 1.34 million as of 2019.

Area and population

References

Metropolitan areas of Indonesia
North Sulawesi